Francis Xavier, SJ (born Francisco de Jasso y Azpilicueta; Latin: Franciscus Xaverius; Basque: Frantzisko Xabierkoa; French: François Xavier; Spanish: Francisco Javier; Portuguese: Francisco Xavier; 7 April 15063 December 1552), venerated as Saint Francis Xavier, was a Navarrese Catholic missionary and saint who was a co-founder of the Society of Jesus.

Born in Javier (Xavier in Old Spanish and in Navarro-Aragonese, or Xabier, a Basque word meaning "new house"), in the Kingdom of Navarre (in present-day Spain), he was a companion of Ignatius of Loyola and one of the first seven Jesuits who took vows of poverty and chastity at Montmartre, Paris in 1534. He led an extensive mission into Asia, mainly the Portuguese Empire in the East, and was influential in evangelisation work, most notably in early modern India. He was extensively involved in the missionary activity in Portuguese India. In 1546, Francis Xavier proposed the establishment of the Goan Inquisition in a letter addressed to the Portuguese King, John III. While some sources claim that he actually asked for a special minister whose sole office would be to further Christianity in Goa, others disagree with this assertion. He was also the first Christian missionary to venture into Borneo, the Maluku Islands, and other areas. In those areas, struggling to learn the local languages and in the face of opposition, he had less success than what he had enjoyed in India. Xavier was about to extend his mission to Ming China, when he died on Shangchuan Island.

He was beatified by Pope Paul V on 25 October 1619 and canonized by Pope Gregory XV on 12 March 1622. In 1624, he was made co-patron of Navarre. Known as the "Apostle of the Indies", "Apostle of the Far East", "Apostle of China" and "Apostle of Japan", he is considered to be one of the greatest missionaries since Paul the Apostle. In 1927, Pope Pius XI published the decree "Apostolicorum in Missionibus" naming Francis Xavier, along with Thérèse of Lisieux, co-patron of all foreign missions. He is now co-patron saint of Navarre, with Fermin. The Day of Navarre in Navarre, Spain, marks the anniversary of Francis Xavier's death, on 3 December.

Early life

Francis Xavier was born in the Castle of Xavier, in the Kingdom of Navarre, on 7 April 1506 into an influential noble family. He was the youngest son of Don Juan de Jasso y Atondo, Lord of Idocín, president of the Royal Council of the Kingdom of Navarre, and seneschal of the Castle of Xavier (a doctor in law by the University of Bologna, belonging to a prosperous noble family of Saint-Jean-Pied-de-Port, later privy counsellor and finance minister to King John III of Navarre) and Doña María de Azpilcueta y Aznárez, sole heiress to the Castle of Xavier (related to the theologian and philosopher Martín de Azpilcueta). His brother Miguel de Jasso (later known as Miguel de Javier) became Lord of Xavier and Idocín at the death of his parents (a direct ancestor of the Counts of Javier). Basque and Romance were his two mother tongues.

In 1512, Ferdinand, King of Aragon and regent of Castile, invaded Navarre, initiating a war that lasted over 18 years. Three years later, Francis's father died when Francis was only nine years old. In 1516, Francis's brothers participated in a failed Navarrese-French attempt to expel the Spanish invaders from the kingdom. The Spanish Governor, Cardinal Cisneros, confiscated the family lands, demolished the outer wall, the gates, and two towers of the family castle, and filled in the moat. In addition, the height of the keep was reduced by half. Only the family residence inside the castle was left. In 1522, one of Francis's brothers participated with 200 Navarrese nobles in dogged but failed resistance against the Castilian Count of Miranda in Amaiur, Baztan, the last Navarrese territorial position south of the Pyrenees.

In 1525, Francis went to study in Paris at the Collège Sainte-Barbe, University of Paris, where he spent the next eleven years. In the early days he acquired some reputation as an athlete and a high-jumper.

In 1529, Francis shared lodgings with his friend Pierre Favre. A new student, Ignatius of Loyola, came to room with them. At 38, Ignatius was much older than Pierre and Francis, who were both 23 at the time. Ignatius convinced Pierre to become a priest, but was unable to convince Francis, who had aspirations of worldly advancement. At first, Francis regarded the new lodger as a joke and was sarcastic about his efforts to convert students. When Pierre left their lodgings to visit his family and Ignatius was alone with Francis, he was able to slowly break down Francis's resistance. According to most biographies Ignatius is said to have posed the question: "What will it profit a man to gain the whole world, and lose his own soul?" However, according to James Broderick such method is not characteristic of Ignatius and there is no evidence that he employed it at all.

In 1530, Francis received the degree of Master of Arts, and afterwards taught Aristotelian philosophy at Beauvais College, University of Paris.

Missionary work

On 15 August 1534, seven students met in a crypt beneath the Church of Saint Denis (now Saint Pierre de Montmartre), on the hill of Montmartre, overlooking Paris. They were Francis, Ignatius of Loyola, Alfonso Salmeron, Diego Laínez, Nicolás Bobadilla from Spain, Peter Faber from Savoy, and Simão Rodrigues from Portugal. They made private vows of poverty, chastity, and obedience to the Pope, and also vowed to go to the Holy Land to convert infidels. Francis began his study of theology in 1534 and was ordained on 24 June 1537.

In 1539, after long discussions, Ignatius drew up a formula for a new religious order, the Society of Jesus (the Jesuits). Ignatius's plan for the order was approved by Pope Paul III in 1540.

In 1540, King John of Portugal had Pedro Mascarenhas, Portuguese ambassador to the Holy See, request Jesuit missionaries to spread the faith in his new possessions in India, where the king believed that Christian values were eroding among the Portuguese. After successive appeals to the Pope asking for missionaries for the East Indies under the Padroado agreement, John III was encouraged by Diogo de Gouveia, rector of the Collège Sainte-Barbe, to recruit the newly graduated students who had established the Society of Jesus.

Ignatius promptly appointed Nicholas Bobadilla and Simão Rodrigues. At the last moment, however, Bobadilla became seriously ill. With some hesitance and uneasiness, Ignatius asked Francis to go in Bobadilla's place. Thus, Francis Xavier began his life as the first Jesuit missionary almost accidentally.

According to a 1549 letter of F. Balthasar Gago from Goa, it was the only book that Francis read or studied. Francis reached Lisbon in June 1540 and, four days after his arrival, he and Rodrigues were summoned to a private audience with the King and the Queen.

Francis Xavier devoted much of his life to missions in Asia, mainly in four centres: Malacca, Amboina and Ternate (in the Maluku Islands of Indonesia), Japan, and off-shore China. His growing information about new places indicated to him that he had to go to what he understood were centres of influence for the whole region. China loomed large from his days in India. Japan was particularly attractive because of its culture. For him, these areas were interconnected; they could not be evangelised separately.

Goa and India

Francis Xavier left Lisbon on 7 April 1541, his thirty-fifth birthday, along with two other Jesuits and the new viceroy Martim Afonso de Sousa, on board the Santiago. As he departed, Francis was given a brief from the pope appointing him apostolic nuncio to the East. From August until March 1542 he remained in Portuguese Mozambique, and arrived in Goa, then capital of Portuguese India, on 6 May 1542, thirteen months after leaving Lisbon.

The Portuguese, following quickly on the great voyages of discovery, had established themselves at Goa thirty years earlier. Francis's primary mission, as ordered by King John III, was to restore Christianity among the Portuguese settlers. According to Teotonio R. DeSouza, recent critical accounts indicate that apart from the posted civil servants, "the great majority of those who were dispatched as 'discoverers' were the riff-raff of Portuguese society, picked up from Portuguese jails." Nor did the soldiers, sailors, or merchants come to do missionary work, and Imperial policy permitted the outflow of disaffected nobility. Many of the arrivals formed liaisons with local women and adopted Indian culture. Missionaries often wrote against the "scandalous and undisciplined" behaviour of their fellow Christians.

The Christian population had churches, clergy, and a bishop, but there were few preachers and no priests beyond the walls of Goa. Xavier decided that he must begin by instructing the Portuguese themselves, and gave much of his time to the teaching of children. The first five months he spent in preaching and ministering to the sick in the hospitals. After that, he walked through the streets ringing a bell to summon the children and servants to catechism. He was invited to head Saint Paul's College, a pioneer seminary for the education of secular priests, which became the first Jesuit headquarters in Asia.

Conversion efforts

Xavier soon learned that along the Pearl Fishery Coast, which extends from Cape Comorin on the southern tip of India to the island of Mannar, off Ceylon (Sri Lanka), there was a Jāti of people called Paravas. Many of them had been baptised ten years before, merely to please the Portuguese who had helped them against the Moors, but remained uninstructed in the faith. Accompanied by several native clerics from the seminary at Goa, he set sail for Cape Comorin in October 1542. He taught those who had already been baptised and preached to those who weren't. His efforts with the high-caste Brahmins remained unavailing. The Brahmin and Muslim authorities in Travancore opposed Xavier with violence; time and again his hut was burned down over his head, and once he saved his life only by hiding among the branches of a large tree.

He devoted almost three years to the work of preaching to the people of southern India and Ceylon, converting many. He built nearly 40 churches along the coast, including St. Stephen's Church, Kombuthurai, mentioned in his letters dated 1544.

During this time, he was able to visit the tomb of Thomas the Apostle in Mylapore (now part of Madras/Chennai then in Portuguese India). He set his sights eastward in 1545 and planned a missionary journey to Makassar on the island of Celebes (today's Indonesia).

As the first Jesuit in India, Francis had difficulty achieving much success in his missionary trips. His successors, such as de Nobili, Matteo Ricci, and Beschi, attempted to convert the noblemen first as a means to influence more people, while Francis had initially interacted most with the lower classes; (later though, in Japan, Francis changed tack by paying tribute to the Emperor and seeking an audience with him).

Southeast Asia
In the spring of 1545 Xavier started for Portuguese Malacca. He laboured there for the last months of that year. About January 1546, Xavier left Malacca for the Maluku Islands, where the Portuguese had some settlements. For a year and a half, he preached the Gospel there. He went first to Ambon Island, where he stayed until mid-June. He then visited the other Maluku Islands, including Ternate, Baranura, and Morotai. Shortly after Easter 1547, he returned to Ambon Island; a few months later he returned to Malacca.

Japan

In Malacca in December 1547, Francis Xavier met a Japanese man named Anjirō. Anjirō had heard of Francis in 1545 and had travelled from Kagoshima to Malacca to meet him. Having been charged with murder, Anjirō had fled Japan. He told Francis extensively about his former life, and the customs and culture of his homeland. Anjirō became the first Japanese Christian and adopted the name 'Paulo de Santa Fé'. He later helped Xavier as a mediator and interpreter for the mission to Japan that now seemed much more possible.

In January 1548 Francis returned to Goa to attend to his responsibilities as superior of the mission there. The next 15 months were occupied with various journeys and administrative measures. He left Goa on 15 April 1549, stopped at Malacca, and visited Canton. He was accompanied by Anjiro, two other Japanese men, Father Cosme de Torrès and Brother Juan Fernández. He had taken with him presents for the "King of Japan" since he was intending to introduce himself as the Apostolic Nuncio.

Europeans had already come to Japan: the Portuguese had landed in 1543 on the island of Tanegashima, where they introduced matchlock firearms to Japan.

From Amboina, he wrote to his companions in Europe: "I asked a Portuguese merchant, ... who had been for many days in Anjirō's country of Japan, to give me ... some information on that land and its people from what he had seen and heard. ...All the Portuguese merchants coming from Japan tell me that if I go there I shall do great service for God our Lord, more than with the pagans of India, for they are a very reasonable people." (To His Companions Residing in Rome, From Cochin, 20 January 1548, no. 18, p. 178).

Francis Xavier reached Japan on 27 July 1549, with Anjiro and three other Jesuits, but he was not permitted to enter any port his ship arrived at until 15 August, when he went ashore at Kagoshima, the principal port of Satsuma Province on the island of Kyūshū. As a representative of the Portuguese king, he was received in a friendly manner. Shimazu Takahisa (1514–1571), daimyō of Satsuma, gave a friendly reception to Francis on 29 September 1549, but in the following year he forbade the conversion of his subjects to Christianity under penalty of death; Christians in Kagoshima could not be given any catechism in the following years. The Portuguese missionary Pedro de Alcáçova would later write in 1554:

Francis was the first Jesuit to go to Japan as a missionary. He brought with him paintings of the Madonna and the Madonna and Child. These paintings were used to help teach the Japanese about Christianity. There was a huge language barrier as Japanese was unlike other languages the missionaries had previously encountered. For a long time, Francis struggled to learn the language. He was hosted by Anjirō's family until October 1550. From October to December 1550, he resided in Yamaguchi. Shortly before Christmas, he left for Kyoto but failed to meet with the Emperor. He returned to Yamaguchi in March 1551, where the daimyo of the province gave him permission to preach.

Having learned that evangelical poverty did not have the appeal in Japan that it had in Europe and in India, he decided to change his approach. Hearing after a time that a Portuguese ship had arrived at a port in the province of Bungo in Kyushu and that the prince there would like to see him, Xavier now set out southward. The Jesuit, in a fine cassock, surplice, and stole, was attended by thirty gentlemen and as many servants, all in their best clothes. Five of them bore on cushions valuable articles, including a portrait of Our Lady and a pair of velvet slippers, these not gifts for the prince, but solemn offerings to Xavier, to impress the onlookers with his eminence. Handsomely dressed, with his companions acting as attendants, he presented himself before Oshindono, the ruler of Nagate, and as a representative of the great kingdom of Portugal, offered him letters and presents: a musical instrument, a watch, and other attractive objects which had been given him by the authorities in India for the emperor.

For forty-five years the Jesuits were the only missionaries in Asia, but the Franciscans also began proselytising in Asia as well. Christian missionaries were later forced into exile, along with their assistants. However, some were able to stay behind. Christianity was then kept underground so as to not be persecuted.

The Japanese people were not easily converted; many of the people were already Buddhist or Shinto. Francis tried to combat the disposition of some of the Japanese that a God who had created everything, including evil, could not be good. The concept of Hell was also a struggle; the Japanese were bothered by the idea of their ancestors living in Hell. Despite Francis's different religion, he felt that they were good people, much like Europeans, and could be converted.

Xavier was welcomed by the Shingon monks since he used the word Dainichi for the Christian God; attempting to adapt the concept to local traditions. As Xavier learned more about the religious nuances of the word, he changed to Deusu from the Latin and Portuguese Deus. The monks later realised that Xavier was preaching a rival religion and grew more resistant towards his attempts at conversion.

With the passage of time, his sojourn in Japan could be considered somewhat fruitful as attested by congregations established in Hirado, Yamaguchi, and Bungo. Xavier worked for more than two years in Japan and saw his successor-Jesuits established. He then decided to return to India. Historians debate the exact path by which he returned, but from evidence attributed to the captain of his ship, he may have travelled through Tanegeshima and Minato, and avoided Kagoshima because of the hostility of the daimyo.

China
During his trip from Japan back to India, a tempest forced him to stop on an island near Guangzhou, Guangdong, China, where he met Diogo Pereira, a rich merchant and an old friend from Cochin. Pereira showed him a letter from Portuguese prisoners in Guangzhou, asking for a Portuguese ambassador to speak to the Chinese Emperor on their behalf. Later during the voyage, he stopped at Malacca on 27 December 1551 and was back in Goa by January 1552.

On 17 April he set sail with Diogo Pereira on the Santa Cruz for China. He planned to introduce himself as Apostolic Nuncio and Pereira as the ambassador of the King of Portugal. But then he realized that he had forgotten his testimonial letters as an Apostolic Nuncio. Back in Malacca, he was confronted by the captain Álvaro de Ataíde da Gama who now had total control over the harbour. The captain refused to recognize his title of Nuncio, asked Pereira to resign from his title of ambassador, named a new crew for the ship, and demanded the gifts for the Chinese Emperor be left in Malacca.

In late August 1552, the Santa Cruz reached the Chinese island of Shangchuan, 14 km away from the southern coast of mainland China, near Taishan, Guangdong, 200 km south-west of what later became Hong Kong. At this time, he was accompanied only by a Jesuit student, Álvaro Ferreira, a Chinese man called António, and a Malabar servant called Christopher. Around mid-November, he sent a letter saying that a man had agreed to take him to the mainland in exchange for a large sum of money. Having sent back Álvaro Ferreira, he remained alone with António. He died from a fever at Shangchuan, Taishan, China, on 3 December 1552, while he was waiting for a boat that would take him to mainland China.

Burials and relics

Xavier was first buried on a beach at Shangchuan Island, Taishan, Guangdong. His body was taken from the island in February 1553 and temporarily buried in St. Paul's Church in Portuguese Malacca on 22 March 1553. An open grave in the church now marks the place of Xavier's burial. Pereira came back from Goa, removed the corpse shortly after 15 April 1553, and moved it to his house. On 11 December 1553, Xavier's body was shipped to Goa.

The body is now in the Basilica of Bom Jesus in Goa, where it was placed in a glass container encased in a silver casket on 2 December 1637. This casket, constructed by Goan silversmiths between 1636 and 1637, was an exemplary blend of Italian and Indian aesthetic sensibilities. There are 32 silver plates on all four sides of the casket, depicting different episodes from the life of Xavier:

Francis lies on the ground with his arms and legs tied, but the cords break miraculously.
Francis kisses the ulcer of a patient in a Venetian hospital.
He is visited by Jerom as he lies ailing in the hospital of Vicenza.
A vision about his future apostolate.
A vision about his sister's prophecy about his fate.
He saves the secretary of the Portuguese Ambassador while crossing the Alps.
He lifts a sick man who dies after receiving communion but is freed from fever.
He baptises in Travancore.
He resuscitates a boy who died in a well at Cape Comorin.
He cures miraculously a man full of sores.
He drives away the Badagas in Travancore.
He resuscitates three persons: a man who was buried at Coulao; a boy about to be buried at Multao; and a child.
He takes money from his empty pockets and gives it to a Portuguese at Malyapore.
A miraculous cure.
A crab restores his crucifix which had fallen into the sea. 
He preaches in the island of Moro.
He preaches in the sea of Malacca and announces the victory against the enemies.
He converts a Portuguese soldier.
He helps the dying Vicar of Malacca.
Francis kneels down and on his shoulders there rests a child whom he restores to health.
He goes from Amanguchi to Macao walking.
He cures a mute or unable to speak and paralytic man in Amanguchi.
He cures a deaf Japanese person.
He prays in the ship during a storm.
He baptises three kings in Cochin.
He cures a religious in the college of St. Paul.
Due to the lack of water, he sweetens the seawater during a voyage.
The agony of Francis at Sancian.
After his death, he is seen by a lady according to his promise.
The body dressed in sacerdotal vestments is exposed for public veneration.
Francis levitates as he distributes communion in the College of St. Paul.
The body is placed in a niche at Chaul with lighted candles. On the top of this casket, there is a cross with two angels. One is holding a burning heart and the other a legend which says, "Satis est Domine, satis est." (It's enough Lord, it's enough)

The right forearm, which Xavier used to bless and baptise his converts, was detached by Superior General Claudio Acquaviva in 1614. It has been displayed since in a silver reliquary at the main Jesuit church in Rome, Il Gesù.

Another of Xavier's arm bones was brought to Macau where it was kept in a silver reliquary. The relic was destined for Japan but religious persecution there persuaded the church to keep it in Macau's Cathedral of St. Paul. It was subsequently moved to St. Joseph's and in 1978 to the Chapel of St. Francis Xavier on Coloane Island. More recently the relic was moved to St. Joseph's Church.

In 2006, on the 500th anniversary of his birth, the Xavier Tomb Monument and Chapel on Shangchuan Island, in ruins after years of neglect under communist rule in China, was restored with support from the alumni of Wah Yan College, a Jesuit high school in Hong Kong.

From December 2017 to February 2018, Catholic Christian Outreach (CCO) in cooperation with the Jesuits, and the Archdiocese of Ottawa (Canada) brought Xavier's right forearm to tour throughout Canada. The faithful, especially university students participating with CCO at Rise Up 2017 in Ottawa, venerated the relics. The tour continued to every city where CCO and/or the Jesuits are present in Canada: Quebec City, St. John's, Halifax, St. Francis Xavier University in Antigonish (neither CCO nor the Jesuits are present here), Kingston, Toronto, Winnipeg, Saskatoon, Regina, Calgary, Vancouver, Victoria, and Montreal before returning to Ottawa. The relic was then returned to Rome with a Mass of Thanksgiving celebrated by Archbishop Terrence Prendergast at the Church of the Gesu.

Veneration

Beatification and canonization
Francis Xavier was beatified by Paul V on 25 October 1619, and was canonized by Gregory XV on 12 March 1622, at the same time as Ignatius Loyola. Pius XI proclaimed him the "Patron of Catholic Missions". His feast day is 3 December.

Pilgrimage centres

Goa
Saint Francis Xavier's relics are kept in a silver casket, elevated inside the Bom Jesus Basilica and are exposed (being brought to ground level) generally every ten years, but this is discretionary. The sacred relics went on display starting on 22 November 2014 at the XVII Solemn Exposition. The display closed on 4 January 2015. The previous exposition, the sixteenth, was held from 21 November 2004 to 2 January 2005.

Relics of Saint Francis Xavier are also found in the Espirito Santo (Holy Spirit) Church, Margão, in Sanv Fransiku Xavierachi Igorz (Church of St. Francis Xavier), Batpal, Canacona, Goa, and at St. Francis Xavier Chapel, Portais, Panjim.

Other places
Other pilgrimage centres include Xavier's birthplace in Navarra; the Church of the Gesù, Rome; Malacca (where he was buried for two years, before being brought to Goa); and Sancian (place of death).

Xavier is a major venerated saint in both Sonora and the neighbouring U.S. state of Arizona. In Magdalena de Kino in Sonora, Mexico, in the Church of Santa María Magdalena, there is a reclining statue of San Francisco Xavier brought by pioneer Jesuit missionary Padre Eusebio Kino in the early 18th century. The statue is said to be miraculous and is the object of pilgrimage for many in the region. Also the Mission San Xavier del Bac is a pilgrimage site. The mission is an active parish church ministering to the people of the San Xavier District, Tohono O'odham Nation, and nearby Tucson, Arizona.

Francis Xavier is honored in the Church of England and in the Episcopal Church on 3 December.

Novena of grace

The Novena of Grace is a popular devotion to Francis Xavier, typically prayed either on the nine days before 3 December, or on 4 March through 12 March (the anniversary of Pope Gregory XV's canonisation of Xavier in 1622). It began with the Italian Jesuit missionary Marcello Mastrilli. Before he could travel to the Far East, Mastrilli was gravely injured in a freak accident after a festive celebration dedicated to the Immaculate Conception in Naples. Delirious and on the verge of death, Mastrilli saw Xavier, who he later said asked him to choose between travelling or death by holding the respective symbols, to which Mastrilli answered, "I choose that which God wills." Upon regaining his health, Mastrilli made his way via Goa and the Philippines to Satsuma, Japan. The Tokugawa shogunate beheaded the missionary in October 1637, after undergoing three days of tortures involving the volcanic sulphurous fumes from Mt. Unzen, known as the Hell mouth or "pit" that had supposedly caused an earlier missionary to renounce his faith.

Legacy

Francis Xavier became widely noteworthy for his missionary work, both as an organiser and as a pioneer; he reputedly converted more people than anyone else had done since Paul the Apostle. In 2006 Pope Benedict XVI said of both Ignatius of Loyola and Francis Xavier: "not only their history which was interwoven for many years from Paris and Rome, but a unique desire – a unique passion, it could be said – moved and sustained them through different human events: the passion to give to God-Trinity a glory always greater and to work for the proclamation of the Gospel of Christ to the peoples who had been ignored." By consulting with the earlier ancient Christians of St. Thomas in India, Xavier developed Jesuit missionary methods. His success also spurred many Europeans to join the Jesuit order, as well as to become missionaries throughout the world. His personal efforts most affected religious practice in India and in the East Indies (Indonesia, Malaysia, Timor).  India still has numerous Jesuit missions and many more schools. Xavier also worked to propagate Christianity in China and Japan. However, following the persecutions (1587 onwards) instituted by Toyotomi Hideyoshi and the subsequent closing of Japan to foreigners (1633 onwards), the Christians of Japan had to go underground to preserve an independent Christian culture. Likewise, while Xavier inspired many missionaries to China, Chinese Christians also were forced underground there and developed their own Christian culture.

A small chapel designed by Achille-Antoine Hermitte was completed in 1869 over Xavier's death-place on Shangchuan Island, Canton. It was damaged and restored several times; the most recent restoration in 2006 marked the 500th anniversary of the saint's birth.

Francis Xavier is the patron saint of his native Navarre, which celebrates his feast day on 3 December as a government holiday. In addition to Roman Catholic Masses remembering Xavier on that day (now known as the Day of Navarra), celebrations in the surrounding weeks honour the region's cultural heritage. Furthermore, in the 1940s, devoted Catholics instituted the Javierada, an annual day-long pilgrimage (often on foot) from the capital at Pamplona to Xavier, where the Jesuits built a basilica and museum and restored Francis Xavier's family's castle.

Personal names 

As the foremost saint from Navarre and one of the main Jesuit saints, Francis Xavier is much venerated in Spain and the Hispanic countries where Francisco Javier or Javier are common male given names. The alternative spelling Xavier is also popular in the Basque Country, Portugal, Catalonia, Brazil, France, Belgium, and southern Italy. In India, the spelling Xavier is almost always used, and the name is quite common among Christians, especially in Goa and in the southern states of Tamil Nadu, Kerala, and Karnataka. The names Francisco Xavier, António Xavier, João Xavier, Caetano Xavier, Domingos Xavier and so forth, were very common till quite recently in Goa. Fransiskus Xaverius is commonly used as a name for Indonesian Catholics, usually abbreviated as FX. In Austria and Bavaria the name is spelt as Xaver (pronounced (ˈk͡saːfɐ)) and often used in addition to Francis as Franz-Xaver (frant͡sˈk͡saːfɐ). In Polish the name becomes Ksawery. Many Catalan men are named for him, often using the two-name combination Francesc Xavier. In English-speaking countries, "Xavier" until recently was likely to follow "Francis"; in the 2000s, however, "Xavier" by itself became more popular than "Francis", and after 2001 featured as one of the hundred most common male baby names in the US. Furthermore, the Sevier family name, possibly most famous in the United States for John Sevier (1745–1815), originated from the name "Xavier".

Church dedications 
Many churches all over the world, often founded by Jesuits, have been named in honour of Xavier. The many in the United States include the historic St. Francis Xavier Shrine at Warwick, Maryland (founded 1720), and the Basilica of St. Francis Xavier in Dyersville, Iowa. Note also the American educational teaching order, the Xaverian Brothers, and the Mission San Xavier del Bac in Tucson, Arizona (founded in 1692, and known for its Spanish Colonial architecture).

In art
 Rubens (1577–1640) painted St Francis Xavier Raising the Dead for a Jesuit church in Antwerp, in which he depicted one of St Francis's many miracles.
 The Charles Bridge in Prague, Czech Republic, features a statue of Francis Xavier.
 In front of Oita Station of Oita City, in Oita Prefecture (previously known as Bungo Province) in Japan, there stands a statue of Francis Xavier.
 The monument Padrão dos Descobrimentos in Belém (Lisbon), Portugal, features a Francis Xavier image.

Music 

 Marc-Antoine Charpentier, In honorem Sancti Xaverij canticum H. 355, for soloists, chorus, flutes, strings and continuo (1688 ?)
 Marc-Antoine Charpentier, Canticum de Sto Xavierio H. 355a, for soloists, chorus, flutes, oboes, strings and continuo (1690).

Missions 
Shortly before leaving for the East, Xavier issued a famous instruction to Father Gaspar Barazeuz who was leaving to go to Ormuz (a kingdom on an island in the Persian Gulf, formerly attached to the Empire of Persia, now part of Iran), that he should mix with sinners:

Modern scholars assess the number of people converted to Christianity by Francis Xavier at around 30,000. While some of Xavier's methods have subsequently come under criticism (he forced converts to take Portuguese names and to dress in Western clothes, approved the persecution of the Eastern Church, and used the Goa government as a missionary tool), he has also earned praise. He insisted that missionaries adapt to many of the customs, and most certainly to the language, of the culture they wish to evangelise. And unlike later missionaries, Xavier supported an educated native clergy. Though for a time it seemed that persecution had subsequently destroyed his work in Japan, Protestant missionaries three centuries later discovered that approximately 100,000 Christians still practised the faith in the Nagasaki area.

Francis Xavier's work initiated permanent change in eastern Indonesia, and he became known as the "Apostle of the Indies" – in 1546–1547 he worked in the Maluku Islands among the people of Ambon, Ternate, and Morotai (or Moro), and laid the foundations for a permanent mission. After he left the Maluku Islands, others carried on his work, and by the 1560s there were 10,000 Roman Catholics in the area, mostly on Ambon. By the 1590s, there were 50,000 to 60,000.

Role in the Goa Inquisition
In 1546, Francis Xavier proposed the establishment of the controversial Goa Inquisition in a letter addressed to the Portuguese King, John III. Xavier addresses the King as the 'Vicar of Christ', owing to his royal patronage over Christianity in the East Indies. In a letter dated 20 January 1548, he requests the king to be tough on the Portuguese governor in India so that he may be active in propagating the faith. Xavier also wrote to the Portuguese king asking for protection in regards to new converts who were being harassed by Portuguese commandants. Francis Xavier died in 1552 without ever living to see the commencement of the Goa Inquisition.

See also

 Catholicism in China
 Catholicism in Japan 
 Catholicism in India 
 Catholicism in Indonesia
 Christianity in China
 Christianity in Japan 
 Christianity in India 
 Christianity in Indonesia
 Goa Inquisition
 History of Roman Catholicism in Japan
 Jesuit China missions
 List of Westerners who visited Japan before 1868
 Mission San Xavier del Bac — San Xavier District, Tohono O'odham Nation, Arizona 
 Xaverian Brothers — religious order in America
 Xavier High School (New York City)
 Xavier School — San Juan City, Philippines
 Xavier University – Ateneo de Cagayan, Cagayan de Oro City, Philippines
 St. Francis Xavier University - Antigonish, Nova Scotia, Canada
 St. Francis Xavier Catholic Secondary School - Milton, Ontario, Canada
 St. Francis Xavier Catholic Secondary School - Mississauga, Ontario, Canada 
 St. Xavier's Institution - Georgetown, Penang, Malaysia
 Saint Francis Xavier, patron saint archive
 Xavier College - Melbourne, Victoria, Australia
 St. Xavier's College, Kolkata
 St. Xavier's School, Kolkata

References

Notes

Citations

Sources

 This article incorporates material from the Schaff-Herzog Encyclopedia of Religion
 
 
 

 

 George M. Moraes (1952): St. Francis Xavier, Apostolic Nuncio (1542-52), Bombay, Konkan Institute of Arts and Science, 35p.
 Jou, Albert (1984). The Saint on a Mission. Anand Press, Anand, India.
 

 Pinch, William R., "The Corpse and Cult of St. Francis Xavier, 1552–1623", in Mathew N. Schmalz and Peter Gottschalk ed. Engaging South Asian Religions: Boundaries, Appropriations, and Resistances (New York, State University of New York Press, 2011)

Further reading
 
 
 Andrew Dickson White (1896 first edition. A classic work constantly reprinted) A History of the Warfare of Science with Theology in Christendom, See chapter 13, part 2, Growth of Legends of Healing: the life of Saint Francis Xavier as a typical example.

External links

Official website of Basilica of Bom Jesus, Old Goa The Shrine of Saint Francis Xavier
Basilica of Bom Jesus, Old Goa The Shrine of Saint Francis Xavier
The Life of St. Francis Xavier
The life and letters of St. Francis Xavier Francis Xavier, Saint, 1506–1552 Coleridge, Henry James, 1822–1893 London: Burns and Oates, (1872)
Saint François Xavier 
Picture of Shangchuan island. The chapel marks the location of his death
The Miracles of St Francis Xavier by John Hardon, SJ
Brief History of Saint Francis Xavier 
Colonnade Statue St Peter's Square
 
 

1506 births
1552 deaths
16th-century Christian saints
16th-century Spanish Jesuits
Anglican saints
Jesuit missionaries in China
Jesuit saints
People celebrated in the Lutheran liturgical calendar
Roman Catholic missionaries in China
Roman Catholic missionaries in Japan
Spanish Roman Catholic missionaries
Spanish Roman Catholic saints
University of Paris alumni
Spanish exploration in the Age of Discovery
Portuguese exploration in the Age of Discovery
Canonizations by Pope Gregory XV
People from Tafalla (comarca)
16th-century people from the Kingdom of Navarre